Tian Yuan (； born 12 January 1975 in Shenyang) is a Chinese-born table tennis player who competes internationally for Croatia. She competed for Croatia at the 2012 Summer Olympics reaching the second round.

Tian Yuan moved to Croatia in 1999. As of 2017, she lives in Varaždin, works as the coach of the Croatia women's national team, and also plays for Grand-Quevilly in the French table tennis league.

References

Chinese emigrants to Croatia
Croatian female table tennis players
Croatian table tennis coaches
Croatian people of Chinese descent
Chinese female table tennis players
Table tennis players at the 2012 Summer Olympics
Olympic table tennis players of Croatia
1975 births
Living people
Table tennis players from Shenyang
Naturalised table tennis players